Mbibana is a town in Nkangala District Municipality in the Mpumalanga province of South Africa.

References

Populated places in the Dr JS Moroka Local Municipality